The Great Smoky Mountains National Park is home to over 1,500 different species of flowering plants--more than any other North American National Park, earning it the nickname of the "Wildflower National Park".   Every spring in late April Great Smoky Mountains National Park is the site of the week-long annual spring wildflower pilgrimage  to celebrate this diversity.
The park is also the site of the All Taxa Biodiversity Inventory
 to inventory all the living organisms in the park.
This article lists some of the Wildflowers of the Great Smokey Mountains National Park, current threats and resources for further information.

Threats

Plant Poaching: 
Plant poaching is a major threat in the park. In particular, ginseng is a popular target. Removal of specimens such as trilliums and orchids for private gardens is also threatening these populations.

Invasive Species: 
Introduced forest pests, such as the Hemlock Woolly Adelgid and Emerald Ash Borer are a major threat to the flora of the national parks, targeting over-story species such as the Eastern Hemlock and Ash trees. Several invasive plant species such as wild garlic mustard, kudzu and multiflora rose can also cause harm by out-competing and displacing native species from the park. Feral hogs are another major invasive threat to the park, as they are habitat generalists that will eat just about anything, including the roots and foliage of the park's wildflowers.

Pollution: 
Within the Great Smoky Mountains, air pollution is a well documented threat to both the foliage of the park and its visitors, contributing to stream acidification, ozone symptoms on plants and high haze levels.

Examples

See also 
 Wildflowers of New England
 Wildflowers of the Canadian Rocky Mountains
 List of San Francisco Bay Area wildflowers
 Lady Bird Johnson Wildflower Center
 Brandywine Wildflower and Native Plant Gardens

Resources 
 Great Smoky Mountains Wildflowers: When & Where to Find Them (Paperback)by Carlos C. Campbell, Aaron J. Sharp, Robert W. Hutson, William F. Hutson, Windy Pines Pub,(April 1996),
 Wildflowers Of Tennessee, The Ohio Valley and the Southern Appalachians (Paperback)by Dennis Horn and Tavia Cathcart, Lone Pine Publishing (2005),

References

External links 
 Species Mapper
 Tennessee Native Plant Society
 North Carolina Native Plant Society
 Official Smokies Nonprofit Wildflower Hikes
 Official Smokies Nonprofit Wildflower Books and Information

Lists of flora of the United States
Wild
Flora of Tennessee
Flora of North Carolina
North Carolina-related lists
Tennessee-related lists